Lake Cowdrey, also known as Lake Cowdry and Cowdry Lake, is a lake in Douglas County, in the U.S. state of Minnesota.

The lake was named for Samuel Burritt Cowdrey, a pioneer settler.

See also
List of lakes in Minnesota

References

Lakes of Minnesota
Lakes of Douglas County, Minnesota